There are hundreds of local council camps of the Boy Scouts of America operated by the Boy Scouts of America. Some of these include:

Active Camps

Alabama

Alaska

Arizona

Arkansas

California

Colorado

Connecticut

Delaware

Florida

Georgia

Hawaii

Idaho

Illinois

Indiana

Iowa

Kansas

Kentucky

Louisiana

Maine

Maryland

Massachusetts

Michigan

Minnesota

Mississippi

Missouri

Montana

Nebraska

Nevada

New Hampshire

New Jersey

New Mexico

New York

North Carolina

North Dakota

Ohio

Oklahoma

Oregon

Pennsylvania

Rhode Island

South Carolina

South Dakota

Tennessee

Texas

Utah

Vermont

Virginia

Washington

West Virginia

Wisconsin

Wyoming

Outside the 50 US states

Closed Camps

Alabama

Arizona

Arkansas

California

Maryland

See also

Local councils of the Boy Scouts of America
List of local councils of the Boy Scouts of America
Defunct local councils of the Boy Scouts of America
List of summer camps
Historically notable Scout camps
Camps of Scouts Canada

References

External links

Scouting-related lists